A Fatal Inversion is a 1987 novel by Ruth Rendell, written under the pseudonym Barbara Vine. The novel won the Crime Writers' Association Gold Dagger in that year and, in 1987, was also shortlisted for the Dagger of Daggers, a special award to select the best Gold Dagger winner of the award's 50-year history.

Plot summary

In the process of burying a beloved dog in the animal cemetery of Wyvis Hall, a beautiful Suffolk country house, the owner unearths the skeletons of a dead woman and baby. The horrific discovery challenges the buried memories and guilt of a small group of young people who, 10 years earlier, spent the broiling Summer of 1976 in a self-indulgently irresponsible idyll at Wyvis Hall, unexpectedly inherited by one of their number. Slowly the facts emerge and the past catches up with them. But which woman is dead? And whose child?

Adaptations
The BBC adapted the novel for Radio 4 in 1991, and in three episodes for television in 1992 as the first novel to be adapted for The Barbara Vine Mysteries. The series starred Jeremy Northam and Douglas Hodge.

References 

1987 British novels
Novels by Ruth Rendell
Works published under a pseudonym
Novels set in Suffolk
Viking Press books